Whitwell and Selside is a former civil parish, now part of the parish of Selside and Fawcett Forest, in South Lakeland, Cumbria, England. It did not have a parish council but a parish meeting. The neighbouring parishes were Whinfell to the east, Skelsmergh and Strickland Roger to the south west, Kentmere and Longsleddale to the west and Shap Rural in Eden District to the north. The main settlement was the village of Selside.

At the 2011 census Whitwell and Selside was grouped with both Fawcett Forest and Longsleddale giving a total population of 296.

There were 14 listed buildings or structures in the parish, including the grade II*, 14th-century, Selside Hall.

Whitwell and Selside was a township until 1866 when it became a separate civil parish. On 1 April 2020 the parish was abolished and merged with Fawcett Forest to form "Selside and Fawcett Forest".

See also

Listed buildings in Whitwell and Selside

References

Further reading

External links
 Cumbria County History Trust: Selside and Whitwell (nb: provisional research only – see Talk page)
 Selside: historical and genealogical information at GENUKI

 

Former civil parishes in Cumbria
South Lakeland District